Sir Samuel Wilson (7 February 1832 – 11 June 1895) was an Irish-born Australian pastoralist and politician, and later a British Member of Parliament.

Wilson was born in Ballycloughan, County Antrim, Ireland, in 1832. He was educated at Ballymena and at first intended taking up civil engineering. For three years he worked for a brother-in-law [Robert Chesney], a linen manufacturer, but in 1852 decided to emigrate to Australia. He arrived in Melbourne in May 1852 and worked on the goldfields, but a few months later decided to join two brothers who had preceded him to Australia, and had a pastoral property in the Wimmera. He was made manager of one of their holdings, and selling a small property he had in Ireland, with his brothers bought Longerenong station for £40,000. He dug waterholes and made dams on the property which much improved and increased its carrying capacity.

Yanko station in the Riverina was then purchased and much improved. In 1869 Wilson bought his brothers' interests in their stations, afterwards bought other stations in Victoria, New South Wales and Queensland, and became very wealthy. He was interested in the Acclimatization Society of Victoria and in 1873 wrote pamphlets on the angora goat, and on the ostrich. In 1878 a paper he had written was expanded into a volume, The Californian Salmon With an Account of its Introduction into Victoria, and published in the same year. In 1879 another edition of this was published in London under the title, Salmon at the Antipodes.

Coursing was his preferred sport and he was President of the Ballarat Coursing Club from at least 1875 to 1882.  He awarded £20 for the winner of the 1875 Ercildoune Cup and in 1876 it was run on his Ercildoune estate.

In 1874 Wilson gave the University of Melbourne £30,000 which with accrued interest was expended on a building in the Gothic style now known as the Wilson Hall. It was the most considerable gift or bequest that the university had received up to then. In the following year he was elected a member of the Victorian Legislative Council (1875-1881) and Legislative Assembly (1861-64) for the Western Province, but he never took a very prominent part in politics. 
Around that time he purchased the magnificent Ercildoune property for a rumoured £250,000.
About the beginning of 1881 he went to England with his family and leased Hughenden Manor, once the property of the Earl of Beaconsfield. He twice contested seats for the House of Commons without success, but in 1886 was elected as a Conservative for Portsmouth and sat until 1892. In September 1893 he again came to Victoria and stayed until March 1895. He became ill soon after his return to England and died on 11 June 1895, and is buried in Kensal Green Cemetery, London.

He was knighted in 1875.  In 1861 he married a daughter of the Hon William Campbell. William Campbell is credited with being the first person to find gold in Clunes in 1850 and so spark the Victoria gold rush. They had four sons and five daughters. The four sons and two daughters survived him. Wilfred Wilson was mortally wounded in an attack on Boer positions at Hartebeestfontein during the Second Boer War.

His eldest son, Lieutenant-Colonel Gordon Chesney Wilson, married Lady Sarah Isabella Churchill, sister of Lord Randolph Churchill, he fell in The First World War on 6th November 1914 and is buried at Zillebeke Churchyard , West Flanders, Belgium.

His daughter Maud Margaret Wilson married Warner Hastings, 15th Earl of Huntingdon in 1892.
His son Clarence lived at Grove Place, Nursling , Southampton, Hampshire

References

 
L. J. Blake, Wilson, Sir Samuel (1832 - 1895), Australian Dictionary of Biography, Volume 6, MUP, 1976, pp 418–419.

External links 
 

1832 births
1895 deaths
Australian pastoralists
Victoria (Australia) state politicians
People from County Antrim
Conservative Party (UK) MPs for English constituencies
UK MPs 1886–1892
Burials at Kensal Green Cemetery
19th-century Australian businesspeople